This is a sortable list of compositions by Richard Wagner.



See also
List of works for the stage by Richard Wagner

Notes

Sources
Deathridge J., Geck M. and Voss E. (1986). Wagner Werk-Verzeichnis (WWV): Verzeichnis der musikalischen Werke Richard Wagners und ihrer Quellen ("Catalogue of Wagner's Works: Catalogue of Musical Compositions by Richard Wagner and Their Sources"). Mainz, London, & New York: Schott Musik International.

External links
 Listing of the Wagner-Werk-Verzeichnis 

 
Wagner, Richard